Mansoor Hayat Khan is a Pakistani politician who had been a member of the National Assembly of Pakistan from October 2018 till January 2023. He is son of Ghulam Sarwar Khan.

Political career
Khan was elected to the National Assembly of Pakistan as a candidate of Pakistan Tehreek-e-Insaf (PTI) from Constituency NA-63 (Rawalpindi-VII) in 2018 Pakistani by-elections held on 14 October 2018.

References

External Link
 

Living people
Pakistan Tehreek-e-Insaf MNAs
Pakistani MNAs 2018–2023
Year of birth missing (living people)